Coposa Airport  is an extremely high elevation airport serving the Pica commune in the Tarapacá Region of Chile.

See also

Transport in Chile
List of airports in Chile

References

External links
OpenStreetMap - Coposa
OurAirports - Coposa
SkyVector - Coposa
FallingRain - Coposa Airport

Airports in Tarapacá Region